Li Ge (born 12 April 1969) is a Chinese former gymnast who competed in the 1992 Summer Olympics.

References

1969 births
Living people
Chinese male artistic gymnasts
Olympic gymnasts of China
Gymnasts at the 1992 Summer Olympics
Olympic silver medalists for China
Olympic medalists in gymnastics
Asian Games medalists in gymnastics
Gymnasts at the 1990 Asian Games
Asian Games gold medalists for China
Medalists at the 1990 Asian Games
Medalists at the 1992 Summer Olympics
Medalists at the World Artistic Gymnastics Championships
20th-century Chinese people